Seigen (written: 清源 or 勢源) is a masculine Japanese given name. Notable people with the name include:

 (born 1914), Chinese Go player
, Japanese swordsman

Japanese masculine given names